The fictional character Two-Face (Harvey Dent) was created by Bob Kane and Bill Finger and first appeared in Detective Comics #66 (August 1942). However, the character in his disfigured state was not portrayed by an actor until half a century later in Batman: The Animated Series. Two-Face has since been substantially adapted from the comics into various forms of media, such as feature films, television series and video games. Two-Face has been voiced by Richard Moll in the DC animated universe, Troy Baker in the Batman: Arkham series, Billy Dee Williams in The Lego Batman Movie, and William Shatner in Batman vs. Two-Face. His live-action portrayals include Billy Dee Williams in Batman (1989 film), Tommy Lee Jones in Batman Forever, Aaron Eckhart in The Dark Knight, and Nicholas D'Agosto in the television series Gotham. In 2009, Two-Face was ranked #12 on IGN's list of the Top 100 Comic Book Villains of All Time.

Television

Live-action

 Harvey Dent never appeared in the 1960s Batman television series. Several scripts featuring the character were developed however, and Clint Eastwood was allegedly slated to play the role at one point. The most prominent of the scripts, submitted by New Wave science fiction author Harlan Ellison, was eventually adapted into the 2015 comic Batman '66: The Lost Episode.
 A pre-disfigured version of Harvey Dent appears on the live-action TV series Gotham, portrayed by Nicholas D'Agosto. Debuting in his self-tiled episode in season one, he is Assistant District Attorney of Gotham City. Harvey meets with Detective Jim Gordon regarding the murders of Thomas Wayne and Martha Wayne parents. He suspects that corrupt billionaire Dick Lovecraft has a connection with the murders. When Bruce Wayne and Selina Kyle were attacked in Wayne Manor by assassins, Harvey believes that Lovecraft hired them, but Gordon and Bullock discover that Lovecraft is not a culprit and is soon killed. After the case, the mayor Aubrey James attempted to punish him for his collaboration with Gordon and their way of solving the case, but relented because of Dent's popular reputation in town. Harvey later reveals to Gordon and Sarah Essen that all charges against Arnold Flass (for committing a murder and involvement in drug dealing) were dropped; Gillian B. Loeb blackmailed Bullock because of the latter's killing a criminal many years ago, using it as a leverage. Dent and Gordon question Loeb's former partner to uncover his secret. During season two, Harvey comes in GCPD with Gordon, GCPD Captain Nathaniel Barnes, Bullock and Theo Galavan after Oswald Cobblepot tried to kill Theo (the latter killed Cobblepot's mother). Harvey is supportive to Theo's mayor candidacy, but is unaware of Theo's criminal intentions and is later seen in Theo's gala party. After Theo is arrested, Dent prosecutes Theo for kidnapping Mayor Aubrey James, but his trial strategy is sandbagged when James, fearing Galavan's retribution, perjures himself and testifies that Cobblepot, not Galavan, kidnapped him. Following Galavan's case, Dent, along with Barnes, questions Gordon about his role in Galavan's death. When Gordon has been framed for police officer Carl Pinkney's murder and sentenced to Blackgate Penitentiary, Bullock tries to persuade Dent to reopen Gordon's trial or at least transfer to another facility, to no avail. This version never turns into Two-Face during the series.
 Two-Face makes a cameo appearance in Titans, portrayed by an unknown stunt double. In the first season finale titled "Dick Grayson", the eponymous character is placed in a dream world created by Trigon, where Batman has gone on a killing spree, taking out his greatest enemies one by one; Two-Face is among them since his dead body can be seen holding his coin inside his cell at Arkham Asylum. In the season three episode "Lazarus", Two-Face is mentioned by Jason Todd for murdering his father and his coin is shown in Batman's trophy room in the Batcave. 
 Harvey Dent is mentioned in the Batwoman episode "Grinning From Ear to Ear" as the uncle of Duela Dent.
 Prior to this, Two-Face is mentioned in The Flash. In the season three finale "Finish Line", Vibe referred to Savitar as 'Two-Face'; this could just be a straightforward comment based on the facial scars of the disfigured time remnant's from the future rather than a direct reference to the criminal in question. In "Armageddon" Pt. 4, Two-Face is mentioned. In the Reverse-Flashpoint timeline, Batwoman states being busy due to Two-Face showing up.
 Harvey Dent will appear in the upcoming CW series Gotham Knights portrayed by Misha Collins. Collins has stated that Dent won't be Two-Face in the first season.

Animation
 The Harvey Dent version of Two-Face appears in the DC Animated Universe, voiced by Richard Moll. 
 Initially, Batman: The Animated Series depicted Dent as not only Gotham City's preeminent District Attorney, but also a best friend to Bruce Wayne. At one point, he dated botanist Dr. Pamela Isley and intended to propose although they had only been dating for a week, however, supervillainess Poison Ivy attempted to kill him with a poisonous kiss over causing a near-extinction of a floral species when building Stonegate Penitentiary. In his alter-ego's self-titled episode, he led a prestigious life and happy engagement to fellow attorney Grace Lamont, he nevertheless began to succumb to his dissociative identity disorder (supposedly stemming from lifelong repression of anger after a childhood bullying incident) during the stress of his reelection campaign. This was exacerbated by crime boss Rupert Thorne stealing his therapy records to use as blackmail material; Dent gave in to his alternate personality Big Bad Harv under Thorne's taunts, savagely attacking Thorne's gang. A shootout ensued and Batman arrived in time to help Dent, but this inadvertently triggered an explosion that severely scarred the left half of Dent's face and body. Subsequently, Dent (and his alternate personality) abandoned any hope of a 'normal' life, and began waging a vendetta against Thorne as the coin-flipping criminal Two-Face. Thorne later tricks Grace into luring Two-Face out and holds both at gunpoint. Two-Face overpowers Thorne and attempts to kill the mobster, but Batman stops Two-Face and sends him to Arkham Asylum. Two-Face is depicted as a crime boss and supervillain in his own right for subsequent episodes. In "The Strange Secret of Bruce Wayne", Two-Face has a fierce bidding war with the Joker and the Penguin regarding Batman's secret identity at Hugo Strange's auction; he thought the very concept of his friend was ludicrous. Two-Face is later shown alongside Poison Ivy, the Penguin, Killer Croc and the Joker in "Almost Got 'Im", during a poker game where each villain brings up a respective encounter with the Dark Knight. In Two-Face's story, he tied Batman on top of a giant coin. When flipped, it would either crush Batman or break all of the Dark Knight's bones. But Batman secretly stole his trademark coin and use the jagged edge to cut through the ropes, capturing Two-Face and his gang. Two-Face annoyingly acknowledged that Gotham "let [Batman] keep [the coin]". In the two-part "Shadow of the Bat", Two-Face manipulates Gil Mason into infiltrating Gotham's justice system as the new Deputy Police Commissioner. Mason's high level of practical abilities earned Commissioner Jim Gordon's trust, and the two eventually arrest Thorne. Two-Face and Mason frame Gordon for working with Thorne (as part of their plan where Two-Face consolidates every crime syndicate in Gotham while Mason takes over the police department), but the two are eventually exposed by Batman, Dick Grayson and Barbara Gordon. In "Trial", Two-Face acts as the 'prosecutor' when Batman's rogues gallery holds the Dark Knight prisoner at Arkham Asylum in a kangaroo court. In "Second Chance", Dent undergoes cosmetic surgery to destroy Two-Face's personality permanently. But before he can go through with the operation, he is kidnapped by thugs under Two-Face's orders in an attempt to remain in control of Dent's psyche. Eventually, Batman and Robin recapture Two-Face and is later grateful to Bruce as he is returned to Arkham.
 Two-Face returns in The New Batman Adventures. In "Sins of the Father", Two-Face is indirectly responsible for Tim Drake's path as Batman's ward. He had Shifty Drake on the run and led to his ex-henchman's death, motivating Robin to join forces with Batman and Batgirl to bring Two-Face to justice. The episode "Judgment Day" reveals that Dent's psyche fragments again as a court-themed vigilante called the Judge who apprehends criminals by using extreme measures, including Two-Face. His third personality is defeated by Batman, and Two-Face is later put on 'trial' by his other personality.
 Two-Face does not appear in Batman Beyond, but an android replica is seen in "Terry's Friend Dates a Robot" and is also mentioned in "Betrayal". When asked about his fate, show creator Paul Dini stated that he was cured and returned to his career in politics, moving to Los Angeles and working as a lawyer for a major film studio.
 An alternate version of Two-Face appears in the Justice League episode "A Better World". This version was lobotomized by the Justice Lords and became a  janitor at Arkham Asylum.
 The Harvey Dent iteration of Two-Face appears in Batman: The Brave and the Bold, voiced by James Remar in "The Fate of Equinox!" and in "The Mask of Matches Malone!" and briefly voiced by Richard Moll in "Chill of the Night!". This incarnation, because of the Golden and Silver Age inspirations of the show, is depicted with green scars. He first appears in "Legends of the Dark Mite!" as part of Bat-Mite's fantasy. In the teaser of "The Fate of Equinox!", Batman finds Two-Face with his henchmen at his hideout. Due to flipping his coin which lands on the non-scarred side, Two-Face helps Batman fight his own henchmen. When he flips his coin again, Two-Face is taken down by Batman. Two-Face makes cameos in "Mayhem of the Music Meister!" singing with the other villains at Arkham Asylum, and in "Sidekicks Assemble!" as one of the villains Robin, Speedy and Aqualad face off against during a simulation in the Batcave. In "Chill of the Night!", Two-Face is one of the villains bidding for a supersonic weapon held by arms dealer Joe Chill. He joins the villains in attacking when they learn that Chill was indirectly responsible for Batman's existence before escaping the scene. Two-Face also appears in "The Mask of Matches Malone!", where Two-Face is pursued by Huntress, Black Canary, and Catwoman, and tries to eliminate the eponymous character.
 Paul Sloane appears in the Young Justice cartoon series, voiced by Kevin Michael Richardson. He appears in the episode "Image" as one of the actors on the fictional sitcom Hello Megan, of which Miss Martian is a fan of. In the episode "Nightmare Monkeys", Sloane once worked with Garfield Logan on Space Trek 3016 as Gretchen Goode praised their performance.
 Harvey Dent appears in Beware the Batman, voiced by Christopher McDonald. This version is still a friend of Bruce Wayne, but is opposed to vigilantes like Batman and aspires to become Mayor. He secretly begins working with Anarky to bring Batman down, and they later hire the mercenary Deathstroke to kill the Dark Knight. Deathstroke uses Dent as bait to lure Batman, but his attempt on the Caped Crusader's life is unsuccessful. Later, Dent intervenes another battle between Batman and Deathstroke (dressed as Batman) in the Gotham Armory. The altercation causes a massive explosion, in which Dent's face is scarred. Now wrapped in bandages, Dent attacks Batman and even Anarky, who mockingly dubs him "Two-Face". His sanity unraveled and his career ruined, Dent declares that he has "plans" for Gotham as he unwraps his bandages denying the viewers the chance to see what the scarred side looks like as he walks off into the night.
 The Harvey Dent iteration of Two-Face makes a cameo appearance in Teen Titans Go!.
 The Harvey Dent iteration of Two-Face appears in Justice League Action, voiced by Robert Picardo. This version, like his DC Animated Universe incarnation, has blue scars.
 Harvey Dent, in his black complexion, makes a cameo in DC Super Hero Girls. In "#TweenTitans", he was one of the cast members of the reality television show created by Bruce Wayne, "Make It Wayne".
 The Harvey Dent iteration of Two-Face appears in Harley Quinn, voiced by Andy Daly. This version does not have a split personality and is blind in one eye. He makes one speaking and two non-speaking appearances in season one, one of which establishes him as a member of the Legion of Doom. In the season two premiere "New Gotham", Two-Face has formed the Injustice League alongside the Penguin, Bane, the Riddler, and Mr. Freeze to take advantage of the chaos the Joker caused when he destroyed Gotham. The villains have divided the city's ruins between them, but refuse to give Harley Quinn an equal share, leading her to attempt to dismantle the League. In "Batman's Back Man", following Harley defeating most of the League, Two-Face and Bane attempt to consolidate their remaining power, though the former refuses to see the latter as an equal partner. After Bane almost kills him in an outburst, Two-Face gives him a pit to make him feel better. In "All the Best Inmates Have Daddy Issues", Harvey Dent is seen in a flashback, in which he led an operation to find and disarm a bomb hidden by the Joker as part of a mayoral campaign. This Dent is shown to care only about gaining power even before the scarring, caring only bout the bomb affecting his chances in the election, and willing to have the non-transformed Dr. Quinzel shot in a chance to take down the Joker. At the episode's end, Two-Face "arrests" Harley and Poison Ivy before putting them on trial on a kangaroo court and sending them to a prison run by Bane in the following episode "There's No Place to Go But Down". He is later defeated and incarcerated by Commissioner Gordon. In the season two finale "The Runaway Bridesmaid", Two-Face is imprisoned at Arkham, but manipulates Gordon into running for mayor and busting Kite Man and Ivy's wedding to gain public support. He later informs an imprisoned Harley about this and briefly teams up with her to escape from Arkham. In the third season, Two-Face has begun assisting Gordon as his mayoral campaign manager using unethical methods, though in reality he is only using Gordon to regain his previous position as Gotham's district attorney. In the episode "Joker: The Killing Vote", after the Joker decides to enter the mayoral race, Two-Face kidnaps his stepson Benicio to force him to step back. This makes Gordon realize Two-Face's manipulation and negative influence on him, and he helps the Joker defeat him and rescue Benicio. Although Gordon plans to kill Two-Face afterwards, the Joker appeals to his better side and convinces him not to, as it would accomplish nothing.

Film

Live-action

Batman

 A pre-disfigured version of Harvey Dent appears in Tim Burton's 1989 film Batman, portrayed by Billy Dee Williams. As the newly elected district attorney of Gotham, Dent vows to lock up mob boss Carl Grissom (Jack Palance). In 2021, DC released a digital-first comic series called Batman '89 which serves as a continuation of the two Tim Burton films. The comic's synopsis advertised that it picks up several unresolved plot threads, including the introduction of Billy Dee Williams' Two-Face.
 Tommy Lee Jones portrays Harvey Dent/Two-Face in the 1995 film Batman Forever, replacing Billy Dee Williams from Batman. His origin story is the same as in the comics, where the district attorney is disfigured when gangster Sal Maroni throws acid on the left side of his face during a trial. He is driven insane to the point of referring to himself in the plural and swears revenge against Batman (Val Kilmer) for failing to save him. He is portrayed as having two molls for each side of his personality - the angelic Sugar (Drew Barrymore) for his "good" side, and the tempestuous "Spice" (Debi Mazar) for his "bad" side. He and his men attack Haly's Circus and murder Dick Grayson's (Chris O'Donnell) family, being indirectly responsible for the youth's transformation into Robin. Two-Face later teams up with the Riddler (Jim Carrey) and learns Batman's secret identity. Two-Face captures Robin and Batman's love interest Dr. Chase Meridian (Nicole Kidman), and holds them hostage at the Riddler's lair. During the film's climax, when Two-Face flips his coin, Batman throws a handful of identical coins into the air. Two-Face then panics and scrambles to find his coin but loses his footing, and subsequently falls to his death.
 In Batman & Robin, Two-Face's costume is seen in Arkham Asylum alongside Riddler's outfit.

The Dark Knight Trilogy
 Harvey Dent was planned to appear in the early scripts of Batman Begins, but was finally cut and replaced by original character Rachel Dawes. According to writer David S. Goyer, the main reason for which Dent was written out from the film was because they realized they "couldn't do him justice". 

Aaron Eckhart portrays Harvey Dent/Two-Face in The Dark Knight. In the film, he is depicted as a tragic hero, lacking the gimmickry and dissociative identity disorder commonly associated with the character. He is nicknamed "Gotham's White Knight" due to his clean public image. At the film's beginning, Dent is Gotham City's new District Attorney and forms a tenuous alliance with Batman (Christian Bale) and Lieutenant James Gordon (Gary Oldman) in order to take down Gotham's organized crime. Corrupt police officers working for mob boss Sal Maroni (Eric Roberts) and the Joker (Heath Ledger) kidnap Dent and his girlfriend Rachel Dawes (Maggie Gyllenhaal) and hold them prisoner in two abandoned buildings set to explode. When the buildings explode, the left half of Dent's face catches on fire, leaving him disfigured, while Rachel is killed in the progress. The Joker later visits Dent while he's recovering at Gotham General Hospital and persuades him to exact revenge against those whom he believes are responsible for Rachel's death. He decides his victims' fates with his two-headed Peace dollar that was scarred on one side during the explosion that killed Rachel.  Dent spares The Joker, shoots and kills one of the traitorous cops who betrayed him and Rachel to the mob, and soon kills Maroni as well. Near the film's climax, Dent kidnaps Gordon's family and holds them hostage at the site of Rachel's death, intent on punishing Gordon, whom he blames for failing to protect Rachel. He decides to leave the life of Gordon's son (Nathan Gamble) to a coin toss, hoping to inflict upon Gordon the pain of losing a loved one, but Batman arrives and persuades Dent to judge the three people who pressured the Mafia to turn to the Joker for assistance: Batman, Gordon and himself. Dent does so by flipping his coin: he shoots Batman and spares himself. Dent flips his coin to determine the fate of Gordon's son, but Batman tackles him off the ledge and Dent falls to his death before he can kill the boy. Batman takes the blame for Dent's crimes to ensure that Dent was remembered as a hero.
Dent's legacy plays an important role in The Dark Knight Rises. Set eight years later, the film reveals that the "Dent Act" legislation has all but eradicated Gotham's organized crime. Plagued with guilt, Commissioner James Gordon considers publicly revealing the truth about Two-Face's killing spree but decides that Gotham isn't ready. Gordon's decision backfires when Bane (Tom Hardy) acquires Gordon's speech regarding the cover-up of Two-Face's crimes and later reads it on live television to undermine confidence in the legal system and throw Gotham's social order into chaos. Following Batman's sacrifice and the League of Shadows' defeat, Batman is honored as Gotham's true savior while the Dent Act is eliminated, and Dent's legacy is tarnished due to the revelation of his Two-Face side.

Animation
 A dummy of Two-Face is seen in the Batcave in Batman Beyond: Return of the Joker, in whose head an elderly Bruce Wayne embeds a batarang.
 A pre-disfigurement Harvey Dent appears in Batman: Year One, voiced by Robin Atkin Downes.
 Harvey Dent appears in the two-part animated adaptation of Batman: The Dark Knight Returns, voiced by Wade Williams.
 The Harvey Dent iteration of Two-Face appears in Lego Batman: The Movie - DC Super Heroes Unite, with Troy Baker reprising the role from the Batman: Arkham video game series.
 The Harvey Dent iteration of Two-Face makes a cameo appearance in Son of Batman.
 The Harvey Dent iteration of Two-Face makes a non-voiced cameo appearance in Batman: Assault on Arkham. He appears as one of the Arkham inmates who are broken free from prison by the Joker, and takes part in the chaotic battle against the police. He later tries to escape in a police car after a short shootout, but Killer Frost freezes his head and pushes him aside to steal the car for herself.
 The Harvey Dent iteration of Two-Face makes a cameo appearance in Batman: The Killing Joke. He has inadvertently dropped his coin outside his cell and is seen futilely scratching the door of his cell in Arkham Asylum.
 The Harvey Dent iteration of Two-Face appears in Batman Unlimited: Mechs vs. Mutants, voiced again by Troy Baker. Two-Face is seen in his cell in Arkham Asylum when the Penguin and Mr. Freeze break into it. Two-Face's coin lands on its moral side when they offer to free him, causing him to decline.
 Two-Face appears in The Lego Batman Movie, with Billy Dee Williams reprising his role. This version resembles a combination of the portrayals from the Tim Burton/Joel Schumacher films: the unscarred side is modeled after Billy Dee Williams' rendition of the character from the film Batman, while his scarred side, with purple hair, a scarred eye, near-exposed skull, and melted skin reflect Tommy Lee Jones' portrayal in Batman Forever.
 The Harvey Dent iteration of Two-Face appears in Batman vs. Two-Face, voiced by William Shatner. This version is set in the continuity of Adam West's Batman television series. In the film, Harvey became Two-Face after Hugo Strange's experiment to extract the evil out of Gotham's criminals goes haywire and half of Harvey's face is exposed to their extracted evil essence. After being stopped by Batman and Robin for his crime spree, Harvey is supposedly cured of Two-Face after surgery. It is revealed that Two-Face hid beneath Harvey's skin and uses the former district attorney's desire to re-obtain his old job to set up Batman and Robin. He captures them and deduces their secret identities (as Bruce was a close friend of Harvey's) and leaves them to the other villains before flying in the sky with the evil extraction to turn the whole town into Two-Faces. Batman and Robin eventually stop him and Harvey manages to fight off the evil inside of him to become himself again. Owing to repressing Two-Face, Harvey doesn't remember Batman's secret identity months later.
 Harvey Dent appears in Batman: Gotham by Gaslight, voiced by Yuri Lowenthal. This version is not a supervillain, and instead a "two-faced" womanizer, despite his marriage. While a friend to Bruce Wayne, Harvey becomes jealous when actress Selina Kyle chooses Bruce as her lover. In bitterness, he tricks the GCPD into thinking Bruce is Jack the Ripper until the end of the film, where Gordon is exposed as Jack.
 The Harvey Dent iteration of Two-Face appears in Suicide Squad: Hell to Pay, voiced by Dave Boat. He is shown in the film's beginning having been captured by Professor Pyg on which Two-Face's evil side demanded Pyg to start the surgical operation to make him scarred on both sides, purging Harvey's persona completely. The operation, however, was interrupted by Scandal Savage and Knockout capturing Pyg. As Harvey's personality voices his gratitude, he is knocked unconscious by Knockout with a punch.
 A Feudal Japan version of Two-Face appears in the anime film Batman Ninja, voiced by Toshiyuki Morikawa in the Japanese version and by Eric Bauza in the English dub. Two-Face was one of Gotham's villains to be pulled into the past. After two years, he gained control of a daimyo's territory and became allied with Gorilla Grodd; he pretended to side with Joker and Harley to gain access to the Quake Machine (which is what sent them to the past). He replaces his American coin with a contemporary Feudal-era coin.
 Two-Face appears in Justice League vs. the Fatal Five, voiced by Bruce Timm. He serves as a guide for Star Boy, who is imprisoned in Arkham due to the present day not having the correct medicine to treat his mental instability.
 Two-Face appears in Batman vs. Teenage Mutant Ninja Turtles, voiced by Keith Ferguson. Unlike the comics where he is mutated into a humanoid mandrill, he instead becomes a literally two-faced cat mutant with two tails and three eyes. Two-Face was defeated by a mutated Batman, who threw him out the window.
 Two-Face appears in Lego DC Batman: Family Matters, voiced by Christian Lanz.
 Two-Face appears in DC Showcase interactive short film Batman: Death in the Family, voiced by Gary Cole. In the storyline where Batman sacrifices himself to save Jason Todd and the latter becomes the vigilante Red Robin, Two-Face ends up fighting him at the mall. After pinning Jason down, he flips his coin to determine his fate. Depending on the viewer's choice, Two-Face either spares Jason, letting him live with the monster he has become; or tries to kill him, only to be stopped by Tim Drake.
 Harvey Dent/Two-Face appears in the two-part film Batman: The Long Halloween, voiced by Josh Duhamel.

Video games

Lego DC series

 The Harvey Dent version of Two-Face appears as a boss and a playable character in Lego Batman: The Video Game, with his vocal effects provided by Steve Blum. In the game's story, Two-Face works alongside the Riddler (in a possible reference to their alliance in Batman Forever) to rob the Gotham Gold Reserves after breaking out of Arkham Asylum. They form a team consisting of Clayface, Mr. Freeze, and Poison Ivy to help them gather various items required for the heist, while trying to avoid Batman and Robin. Whenever the Dynamic Duo almost foils their plan and captures the Riddler, Two-Face drives up in his customized bulletproof van to help the latter escape. Batman and Robin fight Two-Face in the third level of the Riddler's chapter, and although they manage to destroy his van, the villains escape once again. In the final level of the Riddler's chapter, Two-Face and the Riddler break into the vault of the Gotham Gold Reserves and fight Batman and Robin, with the Riddler mind-controlling Two-Face into attacking the heroes whilst he operates a bolt-blast machine. After being defeated, Two-Face and  theRiddler are sent back to Arkham, where the former tries to flip his trademark coin, only to drop it and have it roll out of his cell, much to his dismay. In the villain storyline, Two-Face is playable during the final two levels of the Riddler's chapter. In this game, he wields twin pistols and has immunity to toxins.
 The Harvey Dent version of Two-Face appears in Lego Batman 2: DC Super Heroes, voiced by Troy Baker. He appears as a miniboss in the level "Theatrical Pursuits", where he raids Bruce Wayne's Man of the Year award alongside other villains. He is defeated by Batman and Robin and arrested, but breaks out of prison in the level "Arkham Asylum Antics", after Lex Luthor frees all the inmates. Two-Face drives his weaponized truck alongside the Riddler and Harley Quinn, until Batman and Robin defeat him again, causing him to crash his truck and be re-incarcerated. Two-Face can later be found as an optional boss fight atop City Hall. After defeating him, he is unlocked as a playable character.
 The Dark Knight version of Two-Face appears as a playable character in Lego Batman 3: Beyond Gotham. He is available via the Dark Knight DLC pack. In this game, Two-Face wields a single pistol, and has detective vision, technology access, and acrobatics.
 The Harvey Dent version of Two-Face appears as a boss in Lego Dimensions, once again voiced by Troy Baker. When Sauron takes over Metropolis, Two-Face fights Batman, Gandalf, and Wyldstyle while riding an Oliphaunt. The Lego Batman Movie version appears as the first boss of the first level of The Lego Batman Movie story pack, voiced by Imari Williams.
 The Harvey Dent version of Two-Face appears as a main character in Lego DC Super-Villains, voiced by Peter Jessop. In this game, he wields dual pistols and a rocket launcher.

Batman: Arkham

 Harvey Dent / Two-Face appears in the Batman: Arkham video game series, voiced by Troy Baker:
 In Batman: Arkham Asylum, Two-Face's cell can be found in the Penitentiary. He is also mentioned three times. First shortly after the Joker breaks out of custody, in which the Joker mentions him while talking to Batman on a screen. Secondly, he is mentioned by Oracle while Batman is in the Old Sewer under Arkham Asylum. Finally at the end of the game after defeating the Joker, a police radio states that Two-Face is robbing the Second National Bank, resulting in Batman leaving Arkham Island to pursue him.
 Two-Face appears in Batman: Arkham City. Prior to the game's events, Two-Face attempted to obtain blueprints for Professor Hugo Strange's vault to steal confiscated goods, only to be captured and sent to Arkham City, a lawless and walled city whose inmate inhabitants are free to wreak havoc. During an interview with Strange, the former district attorney reveals that Carmine Falcone was the mobster who threw acid at him. Two-Face then declines Strange's offer to help him become Dent again, so Strange sets him free and informs him of Catwoman's attempted theft of the valuables in his safe. In the game's introductory sequence, Two-Face thwarts Catwoman's heist and kidnaps Catwoman. Seeking to stake his claim and gain prestige, Two-Face puts Catwoman on trial before a kangaroo court in the abandoned Solomon Wayne Courthouse, intending to perform a public execution of the Feline Fatale. When Batman overheard an Arkham City security report indicating Catwoman's plight and goes to the courthouse to save Catwoman, the Dark Knight defeats Two-Face's men and frees Catwoman, and the two work together to subdue the villain who is promptly left hanging over a vat of acid. Later in the game's storyline, Two-Face makes a new bid for influence by taking over the Penguin's turf in Arkham City, and is left as the mega prison's sole reigning crime boss after the Joker's death in the game's ending. Catwoman later goes to the museum after Two-Face's men bomb Catwoman's apartment and take the valuables. There, Catwoman manages to defeat Two-Face and retrieve most of the loot.
 Two-Face also appears in the mobile game Batman: Arkham City Lockdown.
 In Batman: Arkham Origins, Harvey Dent is alluded twice; the first as his election as a district attorney appears in several newspapers and the second when Batman enters the Riddler's lair and sees the possible suspects he believes could be Batman.
 Two-Face returns in Batman: Arkham Knight. He joins Scarecrow's band of supervillains in an attempt to end the Dark Knight once and for all. Using a selection of firearms supplied by the Penguin, Two-Face and his men oversee a string of bank heists in the side mission "Two-Faced Bandit". He is ultimately defeated and sent to the GCPD lockup by Batman. Two-Face later returns in the DLC "A Flip Of A Coin", which features Robin (Tim Drake) protecting Gotham after Batman's apparent death and hunting down the escaped Two-Face at Hell's Gate Disposal Services.
 Paul Sloane is mentioned in Batman: Arkham Knight as Gotham's number two actor before becoming a serial killer. He is also seen on posters for films called Prosecutor and Other Fish to Fry.

Injustice
 The Harvey Dent version of Two-Face makes a cameo appearance in Injustice: Gods Among Us. In the Arkham Asylum level, Two-Face, the Penguin, and the Riddler attack the playable character who thrown through the cell door on the second tier's right side before being punched by Killer Croc into the Arkham arena's next tier. Two-Face also appears in certain missions of mission mode and will attack one of the two fighters based on the coin flip.
 The Harvey Dent version of Two-Face makes a cameo appearance in Injustice 2. In the background of the Arkham Asylum stage, Two-Face is seen inside a cage that any playable character can be knocked into. He is also referenced in one of the intro dialogues between Catwoman and Supergirl; the latter describes the former as being quite two-faced to which the former responds that the villains are mixed up.

Batman: The Telltale Series
 Two-Face appears in Telltale Games' Batman series, voiced by Travis Willingham. Unlike the comics, Harvey becomes Two-Face regardless if he is disfigured or not:
 During the first season, Batman: The Telltale Series, Harvey Dent has been Gotham's District Attorney for some time and is running for Mayor against Hamilton Hill. He is also a close friend of Bruce Wayne, who financially supports his campaign, and courting Selina Kyle. During a Children of Arkham attack on the Mayoral debate, Dent is drugged with a psychoactive agent. If Batman saves Catwoman, Dent is disfigured by a hot light slammed into his face by one of its members. After Hill is murdered, Harvey is sworn in as the new Mayor but begins to show signs of a more aggressive split personality, "Two-Face", which takes control after he catches Bruce in Selina's apartment. Harvey, under Two-Face's influence, takes control of the city through martial law and begins terrorizing its citizens as he tries to defeat the Children of Arkham. He is eventually defeated either by Batman as he tries to seize Wayne Manor or Bruce during a hostage situation, and sent to Arkham Asylum or Blackgate Penitentiary.
 During the second season, Batman: The Enemy Within, Two-Face's campaign poster and (depending on the player's decision in the first game) his lucky coin or the mask he wore over the scarred parts of his face are kept in a display in the Batcave. Additionally, the Gotham Media feed reveals that Harvey's trial has been continuously delayed as each set of attorneys refused to defend him, leading Dent to opt to defend himself in court.

Other games
 A pre-disfigured version of Harvey Dent appears in the video game version of Batman: The Animated Series as a hostage of Poison Ivy.
 Two-Face appears as a boss in The Adventures of Batman & Robin for the Super NES, The Adventures of Batman & Robin for the Sega Genesis, the video game adaptations of Batman Forever, and Batman: Chaos in Gotham (in which he is the final boss).
 The Harvey Dent version of Two-Face is the first boss in the Wii version of Batman: The Brave and the Bold – The Videogame, with James Remar reprising the role. He appears in the teaser to the first episode, where he has kidnapped Mayor George Hill. In the fight, he has Hill tied to a giant penny and flips to decide whether to send henchmen to fight Batman and Robin or to leave himself open to attack. After he is defeated, Batman states that there is still hope for Two-Face to reform, and the former D.A. responds by declaring that he will escape from Arkham.
 The Harvey Dent version of Two-Face appears in DC Universe Online, voiced by Edwin Neal. If the player uses a Hero character, Two-Face will contact him or her when the player reaches level 30, apparently with Harvey Dent being in control. Two-Face will ask the player to help him uncover the Penguin´s smuggling operations in the Old Gotham Subway and will guide the player through the instance. When the player defeats Penguin, Two-Face shows up with his evil side being in control. Two-Face mocks Penguin and announces he is taking over Penguin's business. As it turns out, the Hero character has accidentally helped Two-Face take out his rival. The same process will follow if the player is using a Villain character, but Two-Face's evil side will always be in control in this case. Two-Face is later one of the two bosses to defeat in the duo instance Gotham Mercy Hospital, available only for villains (the other boss being Mr. Freeze). Players can also use Two-Face as one of many playable characters in PVP Legends matches.
 A poster of Two-Face is found in the Amusement Mile in Gotham City Impostors.
 Two-Face is presumed to make an appearance in Gotham Knights, as teased in a digital map image that was shown before the game's announcement.

Merchandise
 Toy Biz has released a Two-Face figure in their DC Comics Super Heroes toy line.
 Several Two-Face figures were made by Kenner for their Batman: The Animated Series and The New Batman Adventures toy lines, based on the animated TV shows.
 A Retro-Action DC Super Heroes figure of Two-Face has been released.
 Two Lego minifigs of Two-Face have been made: one from "Lego Batman", and the other from "Lego Batman 2".
 Multiple Two-Face and Harvey Dent figures were made for the Batman Forever and The Dark Knight toy lines, based on the live-action films.
 Hot Toys has released a Two-Face collectible based on his appearance in The Dark Knight.
 A Two-Face bobblehead was made based on the character's likeness in The Dark Knight, but the manufacturer is unknown. It was never sold in stores, and collectiblegiveaways.com later ran out of stock due to the film's popularity.
 Funko has made a POP! vinyl figure of Two-Face as well as an ImPOPster Two-Face figure.
 A Two-Face mini-figure was released in series 3 of DC Direct's Blammoids line.
 Mattel has released an Arkham City Two-Face figure in their DC Universe Legacy Edition line, packaged with Batman.
 A DC Universe Two-Face Hot Wheels car was released in 2012.
 Fisher-Price Imaginext has made and re-released the same Two-Face figure multiple times in their DC Super Friends line.

Parodies
 During the Batman Sunday comic strips that ran from 1943 to 1946, Two-Face's origin story is somewhat altered. He is introduced as an actor named Harvey Apollo, who is testifying at the trial of criminal Lucky Sheldon, and he is killed at the end of the story arc. His origin is again altered in the Batman daily strips published from 1989 to 1991. In this version, Harvey Dent is scarred by a vial of acid thrown by an unnamed bystander, which was intended for the Joker.
 Chris Allen portrays Two-Face in a musical production entitled Holy Musical B@man! by StarKid Productions.
 From 1999 to 2009, Vekoma made an Invertigo roller coaster in Six Flags America, called Two-Face: The Flip Side. The ride was closed for two seasons until its removal due to repeated mechanical failures.
 The CollegeHumor "Badman" series parodies the final scene in The Dark Knight, where Two-Face threatens Gordon's son. However, Batman does not know that Harvey Dent and Two-Face are the same people, so he thinks he sees three different people whenever the villain turns his head, greatly annoying Dent and the Gordons.

In popular culture
 In the episode "The Strike" of the NBC sitcom Seinfeld, Jerry dates a woman who appears attractive in some settings and ugly in others, whom George nicknames "Two-Face". Jerry asks George: "Like the Batman villain?", and an annoyed George responds: "If that helps you".
 The Harvey Dent iteration of Two-Face appears in Robot Chicken, voiced by Neil Patrick Harris (in "The Ramblings of Maurice") and Giovanni Ribisi (in the DC segments). In the episode "The Ramblings of Maurice", he repeatedly injures his face, resulting in him renaming himself Three-Face, Four-Face, and so on. In the Robot Chicken DC Comics Special, Two-Face appears in the opening where he and Composite Santa get tailored suits together. He next appears in a segment where he uses his coin to determine his bathroom choices. In the final segment where the superheroes and supervillains battle at Aquaman's surprise birthday party, Two-Face flips a coin that lands on the unscarred side, so he knocks himself out. In the sequel, Two-Face bothers Lena Luthor at a coffee shop, as he constantly flips his coin to determine which coffee to order. In the third special, he fights his The Dark Knight film counterpart, and they take turns punching each other based on how the coin lands.
 In the adult animated action comedy show The Venture Bros., there's a villain called Radical Left whose appearance and behavior has strong inspiration from Two-Face.
 In Bat Thumb, Two-Face (renamed "No Face" because he has no face) plans to erase everyone's face in "Gaaathumb City" and marry "Vicki Nail".
 The Hero Factory villain Splitface has a similar personality to Two-Face.
 In the Moriarty the Patriot anime, episodes 19 and 20 of "The White Knight of London" arc, the "Whiteley" character is based on "Two-Face".

Other appearances 

 Two-Face appears in the first and second seasons of the comedic radio drama podcast, Batman: The Audio Adventures, voiced by Ike Barinholtz.

References

Batman in other media
Villains in animated television series
Male characters in film
Male film villains
Male characters in television
Superhero film characters
DC Comics television characters
Video game bosses
Action film villains
DC Animated Universe characters